Matthew John McEachan (born 2 July 1970) is a former Australian politician, political strategist and campaigner. He was the Liberal National Party member for Redlands in the Queensland Legislative Assembly from 2015 to 2017. He was made Shadow Assistant Minister to the Leader of the Opposition in 2016, and served on the parliamentary Ethics, Health, Transport and Utilities committees.

References

1970 births
Living people
Members of the Queensland Legislative Assembly
Liberal National Party of Queensland politicians
Griffith University alumni
21st-century Australian politicians